Broome Eric Pinniger (28 December 1902 – 30 December 1996) was an Indian field hockey player.

Life
Pinniger competed in the 1928 Summer Olympics and 1932 Summer Olympics. In 1928 he was vice captain of the Indian field hockey team, which won the gold medal. He played five matches as halfback and scored one goal. Four years later he was again vice captain of the Indian field hockey team, which won the gold medal. He played two matches as halfback. He was born in Saharanpur, India. He studied at Oak Grove School, Mussoorie.

References

External links
 
 Broome Pinniger's profile at databaseOlympics
 Broome Pinniger's profile at Sports Reference.com

1902 births
1996 deaths
People from Saharanpur
Field hockey players from Uttar Pradesh
Olympic field hockey players of India
Field hockey players at the 1928 Summer Olympics
Field hockey players at the 1932 Summer Olympics
Indian male field hockey players
Olympic gold medalists for India
Anglo-Indian people
Olympic medalists in field hockey
Medalists at the 1932 Summer Olympics
Medalists at the 1928 Summer Olympics
Indian emigrants to Scotland
British people of Anglo-Indian descent